Okolište is a village in the municipality of Svrljig, Serbia. According to the 2011 census, the village has a population of 92 inhabitants.

Population

References

Populated places in Nišava District